The 26th Golden Melody Awards ceremony for popular music category was held on June 27, 2015. The TTV network broadcast the show live from the Taipei Arena in Taipei, Taiwan. The ceremony recognized the best recordings, compositions, and artists of the eligibility year, which runs from January 1, 2014 to December 31, 2014.

Winners and nominees

Winners are highlighted in boldface.

Vocal category – Record label awards

Song of the Year 
 "Island's Sunrise (Original Version Re-mixed)" (from Island's Sunrise) – Fire EX.
 "Missing" (from Missing) – Lala Hsu
 "The Rest of Time" (from Wake Up Dreaming) – Jacky Cheung
 "Faces of Paranoia" (from Faces of Paranoia) – aMEI, Soft Lipa
 "Play" (from Play) – Jolin Tsai

Best Mandarin Album 
 Play – Jolin Tsai Missing – Lala Hsu
 Wake Up Dreaming – Jacky Cheung
 Rice & Shine – Eason Chan
 Aiyo, Not Bad – Jay Chou
 Departures – Karen Mok

 Best Hokkien Album
 The Most Beautiful Flower – Ricky Hsiao Timeless Sentence – Chthonic
 The Tenth Album – New Formosa Band
 Ye Shou – Hsieh Ming-yu
 Polaris – Chan Ya-wen

 Best Hakka Album 
 The Songs of Mountain Are All on the One Road – Ayugo Huang Daylight – Huang Wei-jie
 Curving Roads – Huang Pei-shu
 On the Road – Misa
 Moments of Love – Sinco Chiu

  Best Aboriginal Album 
 Polynesia – Chalaw Pasiwali Hosa – Hosa
 Wild Boxing – Boxing
 Ocean, Forest – Suming
 Ima Lalu Su – Inka Mbing & Her Young Atayal Friends

 Best Music Video 
 Shockley Huang – "Nebulous" (from You Lovely Bastard) Li Bo-en – "Selfie Addict" (from XXXIII)
 Muh Chen – "Play" (from Play)
 Hou Chi-jan – "We're All Different, Yet the Same" (from Play)
 Teng Yung-shing, Xi Ran – "In a Flash" (from In a Flash)

Vocal category – Individual awards 

 Best Composition 
 William Wei – "Wolves" (from Journey Into The Night) Europa Huang – "Missing" (from Missing) 
 Li Ronghao – "King of Comedy" (from Li Ronghao)
 JJ Lin – "Listen Up" (from Rice & Shine)
 Chang Shilei – "Departures" (from Departures)

 Best Lyrics 
 Francis Lee – "Departures" (from Departures) Hush – "Missing" (from Missing) 
 Wyman Wong – "King of Comedy" (from Li Ronghao)
 Lin Xi – "Listen Up" (from Rice & Shine)
 Lin Xi – "It's All Good" (from Departures)

 Best Music Arrangement 
 Buddha Jump – "Let You See" (from Let You See) Chen Chien-chi – "Missing" (from Missing) 
 Lawrence Ku – "Touching Hearts" (from To the Top)
 Pessi Levanto – "Forgotten Times" (from Midnight Cinema)
 Starr Chen, Nese Ni – "Play" (from Play)

 Producer of the Year, Album 
 Arai Soichiro – Departures
 Ayugo Huang – The Songs of Mountain Are All on the One Road 
 Joanna Wang, Pessi Levanto – Midnight Cinema
 Chen Chien-chi – You Lovely Bastard
 Jay Chou – Aiyo, Not Bad

Producer of the Year, Single 
 Xiao An – "Lip Reading" (from Play)
 JJ Lin – "Listen Up" (from Rice & Shine)
 Stefanie Sun – "Kepler" (from Kepler)
 Xiao An – "Sophisticated Game" (from Grown Love)
 Starr Chen – "Play" (from Play)

Best Mandarin Male Singer
 Eason Chan – Rice & Shine''
 Jacky Cheung – Wake Up Dreaming 
 Khalil Fong – Dangerous World
 William Wei – Journey Into the Night
 Roger Yang – Beast in the Dark

Best Mandarin Female Singer 
 aMEI – Faces of Paranoia''
 Lala Hsu – Missing
 Waa Wei – You Lovely Bastard
 Karen Mok – Departures
 A-Lin – Guilt

Best Taiwanese Male Singer 
 Hsiao Huang-chi – The Most Beautiful Flower''
 Daniel Luo – Hero
 Henry Hsu – An Inch of True Heart
 Hsieh Ming-yu – Ye Shou
 Michael Shih – Kui-Cho Hai-Liau-Liau

Best Taiwanese Female Singer 
 Angie Lee – Breeze, City''
 Tseng Hsin-mei – Rainwater
 Ara Guo – Women's Courage
 Chan Ya-wen – Polaris
 Sun Shu-may – Love Me Forever If You Dare

Best Hakka Singer 
 Ayugo Huang – The Songs of Mountain Are All on the One Road  Huang Wei-jie – Daylight 
 Huang Pei-shu – Curving Roads 
 Misa – On the Road  
 Sinco Chiu – Moments of Love Best Aboriginal Singer 
 Chalaw Garu – Polynesian''
 Boxing – Wild Boxing Suming – Sea, Forest Best Band 
 Buddha Jump – Let You See''
 Chthonic – Timeless Sentence Trash – Start from Zero The Chairman – One World Boxing – Boxing Magic Power – Fighting for Love Best Group 
 Murmurshow – Murmurshow
 New Formosa Band – The Tenth Album MJ116 – Fresh Game 
 PiA – Ain't Life a Surprise 
 Gentleman – Imperfect Gentleman Best New Artist 
 Boxing – Boxing
 Shi Shi – Girls Adrian Fu – Good Morning, Hard City Chen Hui-ting – 21 Grams Wang Hui-chu – A Voyage of Vera Instrumental category – Record label awards 

  Best Instrumental Album 
 The Flow – Eiji Kadota Interestring Quartet – Interestring Quartet
 Homeland – Vincent Hsu
 The Rest of Life - Seediq Bale – Purdur

 Instrumental category – Individual awards 

  Producer of the Year, Instrumental 
 Daniel Ho – Our World in Song - An Odyssey of Musical Treasures Yu Chia-lun, Huang Wei-Jun – Interestring Quartet Eiji Kadota, Michael Ning – The Flow Vincent Hsu – Homeland Peng Fei – 3rd Month  Best Instrumental Composition 
 Peng Fei – "Night Cats" (from 3rd Month)
 Huang Wei-Jun – "Let's Play" (from Interestring Quartet)
 Eiji Kadota – "Dolphin Island" (from The Flow)
 Vincent Hsu – "A New One" (from Homeland)
 Purdur – "The Rest of Life" (from The Rest of Life - Seediq Bale)

 Technical category – Individual awards 

 Best Album Design 
 Aaron Nieh – Enchantment
 Joe Fang – Faces of Paranoia 
 Lo Wen-tsen, Tsai An-teng, Wu Chih-yin – Faces of Paranoia 
 Howza Hsu – Sweet Home Ka-Aluwan Aaron Nieh – Play 
 Lee Chung-chiang – Aiyo, Not Bad (USB version)

 Technical category – Record label awards 

 Best Vocal Recording Album 
 Play – Jolin Tsai
 Midnight Cinema – Joanna Wang
 Dangerous World – Khalil Fong
 Departures – Karen Mok
 Polynesia – Chalaw Pasiwali

 Best Instrumental Recording Album 
 Led by the Sea Breeze – Rich Huang
 Interestring Quartet'' – Interestring Quartet
 Stranger – Chen Jo-yu
 Music Non-Stop – Lee Shih-yang, Sabu Toyozumi

Lifetime Contribution Award 
 Chen Yang
 Jody Chiang

References

External links
 Official Website
 Official YouTube Channel

Golden Melody Awards
Golden Melody Awards
Golden Melody Awards
Golden Melody Awards